Childreach may refer to:
 Childreach International, a charity based in London, UK
 Plan USA or Childreach/Plan International